King Frederick VIII Land is a major geographic division of northeastern Greenland. It extends above the Arctic Circle from 76°N to 81°N in a N/S direction along the coast of the Greenland Sea.

History 
This vast desolate region was still uncharted territory around 1900. It was explored by the 1906–08 Danmark Expedition, the 1909–12 Alabama Expedition and by J.P. Koch's 1912–13 Danish Expedition to Queen Louise Land, when the ruling monarch was Frederik VIII (1843 – 1912)

The area between 79° and 81°30´N was first marked as 'King Frederick VIII Land', after King Frederick VIII of Denmark then the ruling
monarch, by the 1906–08 Danmark Expedition in its maps of the region. Einar Storgaard used the name again in a 1927 map —he also proposed a division of the region into a northern and a southern part with a border along Nioghalvfjerd Fjord. Finally the name came into general usage only after the publication of the 1931–34 Three-year Expedition to East Greenland (Treårsekspedition) reports.

Geography 
King Frederick VIII Land stretches between 76°N along the middle of the Bessel Fjord in the south and 81°N, the boundary running along the middle of the Independence Fjord and the Academy Glacier.
It is bordered by King Christian X Land on the south, the Wandel Sea to the north, Peary Land to the northwest, and the Greenland Ice Sheet to the west. All its territory is included in the large Northeast Greenland National Park zone.

King Frederick VIII Land includes mountain ranges, such as the Princess Caroline-Mathilde Alps, nunataks, such as Queen Louise Land, and vast glacier expanses, such as the Storstrommen, the Zachariae Isstrom and the Nioghalvfjerdsbrae of far northeastern Greenland. In the areas of the shore it also includes fjords, such as the Skaer Fjord, the Ingolf Fjord and the Borge Fjord in Dove Bay, as well as numerous coastal islands, such as Hovgaard Island in the shore of the Greenland Sea or Princess Thyra Island in the Wandel Sea. The Greenland ice sheet reaches the shore at Jokel Bay. Flade Isblink, the largest independent ice cap in Greenland is also located in King Frederick VIII Land.

The area of King Frederick VIII Land is practically uninhabited. Currently the only two inhabited places are: 
Danmarkshavn weather station is on the southern shore of the Germania Land Peninsula. It was named by the 1906–08 Danmark Expedition after 'Danmark', the ship of the expedition which wintered there. 
Nord, a Danish military base/weather station located further north in the Crown Prince Christian Land Peninsula.

Image gallery

See also
Cartographic expeditions to Greenland

References 

Geography of Greenland